The Irish State Coach is an enclosed, four-horse-drawn carriage used by the British Royal Family. It is the traditional horse-drawn coach in which the British monarch travels from Buckingham Palace to the Palace of Westminster to formally open the new legislative session of the UK Parliament.

History and current use

The original Irish State Coach was built as a speculative venture in 1851 by John Hutton & Sons of Dublin, who held a Royal Warrant as coachbuilders to Queen Victoria. Exhibited at the 1853 Great Industrial Exhibition, it was admired by the Queen, purchased and delivered to the Royal Mews. From 1861 it became the Queen's state carriage of choice, as she declined to use the Gold State Coach following the death of Prince Albert.

Under Edward VII, when use of the Gold Coach resumed, the Irish coach was made available for the Prince of Wales to use, and decorated with his insignia. Prior to his coronation as George V, the coach was sent for refurbishment to the workshops of Barker & Co. of Notting Hill. Whilst there, in 1911, it was extensively damaged by fire (with only the metal framework left intact); however, Barkers completely reconstructed it to the original design in the space of nineteen weeks, in time for it to be used in the coronation procession.

After the end of the Second World War the Irish State Coach (in place of the Gold Coach) came to be used habitually by the monarch at the State Opening of Parliament, as well as to convey King George VI and the then-Princess Elizabeth to Westminster Abbey for her wedding to Prince Philip, Duke of Edinburgh. After 1988 the Australian State Coach was used on some occasions (especially in cold weather), and in 1989 the opportunity was taken for a complete restoration of the Irish coach to be undertaken by the Royal Mews carriage restorers (the first time such an extensive restoration had been undertaken in-house). Since then, the Irish State Coach has continued to be used intermittently by the Queen for the State Opening of Parliament (and on other occasions); in recent years, with the Queen making use of the Diamond Jubilee State Coach, the Irish coach has carried the Prince of Wales and Duchess of Cornwall at State Openings.

Description
The exterior is blue and black with gilt decoration and the interior is covered in blue damask. It is normally driven from the box seat using two or four horses (though it can also be postilion driven with the box seat removed). Along with several other Royal state coaches, it is stored in the Royal Mews, where it can be seen by the public.

See also 
 Gold State Coach
 Scottish State Coach
 State opening of Parliament

References

External links

1851 establishments in Ireland
British monarchy
Royal carriages
Vehicles of the United Kingdom
1851 works
Coaches (carriage)
Queen Victoria